Rolf Frederick Cornelis Muntz (born 26 March 1969) is a Dutch professional golfer.

Muntz was born in Voorschoten. As an amateur, he won three Dutch Amateur Championships and two Dutch Stroke Play Championships and became the first Dutchman to win The Amateur Championship. He also represented the Netherlands in the Eisenhower Trophy in 1990 and 1992 before quitting his law and psychology studies at Leiden University to turn professional in 1993.

Muntz began his career on the second tier Challenge Tour in 1994, finishing 13th on the end of season rankings, and picking up his first title. At the end of that year, he qualified for the elite European Tour for 1995 at final qualifying school. Having had to return to qualifying school at the end of his rookie season, where he was again successful, he maintained his status on the tour through the 2004 season through his position on the Order of Merit.

In 1999 Muntz came close to his first European Tour victory when he lost to Warren Bennett in a play-off for the Scottish PGA Championship. The following season he won the Qatar Masters to become the first Dutchman to win a European Tour event since the tour was founded in 1972 and the first to win a top level European professional tournament since Joop Rühl won the 1947 Dutch Open.

Muntz has also played on the Sunshine Tour and represented the Netherlands in the WGC-World Cup in 1999.

Amateur wins (6)
1990 The Amateur Championship, Dutch Amateur Championship
1991 Dutch Amateur Championship, Dutch Stroke Play Championship
1992 Dutch Amateur Championship
1993 Dutch Stroke Play Championship

Professional wins (7)

European Tour wins (1)

European Tour playoff record (0–1)

Challenge Tour wins (2)

Other wins (4)
1994 Nedcar National Open (Netherlands)
1995 Nedcar National Open, Muermans Vastgoed Cup (both Netherlands)
2008 Ricoh National Open (Netherlands)

Results in major championships

Note: Muntz never played in the U.S. Open or the PGA Championship.

CUT = missed the half-way cut

Team appearances
Amateur
European Amateur Team Championship (representing the Netherlands): 1991, 1993
St Andrews Trophy (representing the Continent of Europe): 1990, 1992
Eisenhower Trophy (representing the Netherlands): 1990, 1992

Professional
World Cup (representing the Netherlands): 1995

External links

Dutch male golfers
European Tour golfers
Sunshine Tour golfers
People from Voorschoten
Sportspeople from South Holland
1969 births
Living people
20th-century Dutch people